Eremophila crenulata is a flowering plant in the figwort family, Scrophulariaceae and is endemic to the far west of Western Australia. It is a large shrub, distinguished by its broad leaves which have distinctively wavy margins. The flowers are white, pink or blue and occasionally purple.

Description
Their most distinctive feature is their margins which are wavy and have rounded teeth. There is a distinct mid-rib on the lower surface and the upper surface has tiny dents.

The petal tube is white to lilac-coloured on the outside and white with lilac or purple spots inside. Most of the petal tube is glabrous except for the inside which has long soft hairs. The 4 stamens are fully enclosed within the tube or about the same length as it.

Taxonomy and naming
Eremophila crenulata was first formally described by Robert Chinnock in 2007 and the description was published in Eremophila and Allied Genera: A Monograph of the Plant Family Myoporaceae. The specific epithet (crenulata) is a Latin word meaning "minutely notched".

Distribution and habitat
This eremophila occurs between Coburn Station and Gascoyne Junction in the Carnarvon and Gascoyne biogeographic regions where it grows in red sandy soils, on dunes and near shallow lakes.

Conservation status
Eremophila crenulata is classified as "not threatened" by the Government of Western Australia Department of Parks and Wildlife.

Use in horticulture
The glossy leaves contrasting with white to pale lilac-coloured flowers make this eremophila an attractive medium-sized shrub. It is difficult to propagate other than by grafting onto Myoporum species and prefers a well-drained soil, but once established it is tolerant of drought although sensitive to frost.

References

crenulata
Eudicots of Western Australia
Plants described in 2007
Endemic flora of Western Australia